The 31st Infantry Regiment, King Bhumibol's Guard is a King's Guard regiment of the 1st Division, King's Guard of the Royal Thai Army. The regiment was created in 1955. The regiment, despite being designated an infantry regiment is in fact a rapid deployment force unit. They are trained to be elite paratroopers (currently, armored units have been added.), but they are not special forces or lrrp. The regiment is based in Lopburi. The regiment was honoured with the additional title of 'King Bhumibol Adulyadej's Guards'.

History
The regiment was founded on the 10 November 1955 as the 31st Combined Regiment (กรมผสมที่ 31). In 1956 the regiment became part of the 1st Division. The 1st Battalion of the regiment was transformed into a paratrooper unit in 1969, the rest of the battalions soon followed. In 1976 the regiment was designated a King's Guard unit. The regiment's name was changed from the '31st Combined Regiment' to '31st Infantry Regiment, King's Guard' in 1979. In 1980 the regiment was further honoured with the additional title of 'King Bhumibol Adulyadej's Own Guards'.

Organization
The regiment is divided into three infantry battalions:
 Armored Company
 Mortar Company
 Reconnaissance Patrol Company
 1st Infantry Battalion, 31st Infantry Regiment, King Bhumibol's Guard
 2nd Infantry Battalion, 31st Infantry Regiment, King Bhumibol's Guard
 3rd Infantry Battalion, 31st Infantry Regiment, King Bhumibol's Guard

References

External links
 Official Website of the 31st Infantry Regiment, King's Guard
 Thai Rapid Deployment Force

King's Guard units of Thailand
Airborne units and formations of Thailand
Military units and formations established in 1955
1955 establishments in Thailand